Mohamed Rashad (1952 – 2002) also referred as Madhaha Rashad was a Maldivian singer.

Early life and career
Rashad was born in 1952 in Male'. His father, Qasim Hussain was famously known for locals as "Naivaadhoo Kasim" and "Reendhoo Kasim". His mother, Hawwa Idhurees was a homemaker. He had one brother as a sibling and ten others as half-siblings including notable local artists, Ali Rameez, Ibrahim Rameez and Rafiyath Rameeza. At a very young age, persuaded by his "undying love for music", Rashad was accompanied by the music group "Maafannu Fiyaathoshi Club" to lift and transport their music instruments. On one such occasion, he had perform a song as a replacement of one of the singers in his absence. It was then his talent was identified and appreciated among the audience and he became a vocal performer of the group. Afterwards, he started collaborating with other music groups too. Music critics noted that his voice resembles that of Indian singer Talat Mahmood. In 1996, the Government of Maldives honoured him with the National Award of Recognition.

Rashad became the most prominent and frequently collaborated voice in performing "Madhaha" for Dhivehi Raajjeyge Adu, after the Friday prayer and during the Ramazan breakfast hours. Critics praising his singing skills noted that "Rashad is one of the few singers who actually knows the technicality of singing". "Feenaashey Jehunee" from the film Edhi Edhi Hoadheemey (2002) was the last released song of him which was well received by the audience and critics. Apart from singing, Rashad played instruments including keyboard, Harmonia and guitar, as educated under the close instruction from Abdul Raheem and Mohamed Shiham. He also studies voice training and taught the skill to interested singers and students performing in inter-school singing competition. Rashad was blessed with eight children and six grandchildren before his demise. To honor his contribution to the music industry, Television Maldives dedicated one episode of the Ehan'dhaanugai series to Rashad, where his youngest child, Hassan Jalaal performed in the show.

Discography

Feature film

Television

Non-film songs

Religious / Madhaha

Accolades

References 

People from Malé
1952 births
Maldivian playback singers
2002 deaths